The Belmont Mountains are a 25 mi (40 km)  long, arid, low elevation mountain range about 50 mi west of Phoenix, Arizona in the northern Sonoran Desert, north of the Gila River. The range is in the south of a region of two parallel washes; the Bouse Wash flows northwest to the Colorado River, and the Centennial Wash flows southeast to meet the Gila River.

Description
The Belmont Mountains are a northwest by southeast trending range, mostly of low hills; the range curves westwards at the west end. At the west, the range is partially connected to the Big Horn Mountains to the southwest, and between the two ranges is the Hummingbird Springs Wilderness. The  wilderness takes up much of the Belmont's northwest, and the northeast half of the Big Horn's. Most of the rest of the small Big Horn Mountains is the Big Horn Mountains Wilderness. Valleys border both mountain ranges, to the northeast, and the southwest.

Access
The north of the Belmont Range can be reached from Aguila, Arizona, on U.S. Route 60 in Arizona. The south of the range can be reached from Interstate 10 in Arizona, near Tonopah.

See also
 List of mountain ranges of Maricopa County, Arizona

References

External links
 Hummingbird Springs Wilderness, Arizona Wilderness Areas – Public Lands
 Belmont Mountain Summit, mountainzone.com, (coordinates)

Mountain ranges of the Sonoran Desert
Mountain ranges of Maricopa County, Arizona
Mountain ranges of Arizona